Zeph E. Daniel (formerly known as Woody Keith) is a screenwriter, film director, and producer. He is known for conceiving and co-writing the 1989 American body horror film Society, as well as the 1990 film Bride of Re-Animator, with Rick Fry. Daniel also wrote Silent Night, Deadly Night 4: Initiation (1990), and served as a producer and writer on the 2021 film Girl Next.

PODCAST

"The Zeph Report" podcast started in 2002. The Zeph Report analyzes the topics of Christianity, gangstalking, current events and behind the scenes of Hollywood.  

BOOKS 

Lamb (June 2002) Fiction. An end-times prophetic tale. 

Glass Backwards (June 2003) Fiction. A satanic unseen reality exposed.

Filmography

References

Bibliography

External links
 

Year of birth missing (living people)
American film directors
American film producers
American male screenwriters
Living people
20th-century American screenwriters
20th-century births